David Narey  (born 12 June 1956) is a former Scottish international footballer who spent 21 years with Dundee United. With Narey United were Scottish champions once and league cup winners twice. He also played in numerous cup runs in Europe including playing in the 1983-84 European Cup semi final and the 1987 UEFA Cup Final. Although best remembered as a central defender, he occasionally played in midfield. After leaving United he won the 1994-95 Scottish League Cup with Raith Rovers.

He collected 35 full caps for Scotland including playing in two World Cups. Narey opened the scoring for Scotland against Brazil with a 20-yard drive in the 1982 FIFA World Cup. He is a Scottish Football Hall of Fame inductee as he is also at Dundee United.

Early life
Narey was born and brought up in Dundee and attended St John's Roman Catholic High School. He played football for St Columba's Boys Club and signed schoolboy forms with Dundee United in January 1972.

Playing career

Club
Narey signed professionally with Dundee United in 1973 and made his senior debut in a Scottish Football League match against Falkirk on 21 November that year, playing as an attacking midfielder.

Narey won three trophies in his career with Dundee United, the Scottish League Cup in 1979 and again in 1980 and the Scottish Football League Premier Division title in 1983.  He also captained United when they played in the 1987 UEFA Cup Final against IFK Gothenburg, which they lost 1–0 in the first leg in Sweden and drew the return leg at Tannadice 1-1, for a 2–1 defeat on aggregate.

Narey played in four Scottish Cup finals (as well as the 1981 Scottish Cup Final replay) while with United, but on each occasion the side failed to win the trophy.

Upon leaving United, Narey joined Raith Rovers, who were playing in the Scottish Football League First Division.  He was part of the Raith team that won promotion to the Premier Division as First Division champions.  He also played in the Raith team that defeated Celtic in the 1994 Scottish League Cup Final, winning the Man-of-the-Match award for his performance in the game.

International
Narey made his international debut for Scotland against Sweden in April 1977, becoming the first Dundee United player to represent Scotland at full international level. He played in both the 1982 and 1986 FIFA World Cups and  scored his only international goal during the 1982 tournament, a long range shot against Brazil. Television pundit Jimmy Hill upset Scottish fans by describing the goal as a "toe poke". By contrast The Glasgow Herald correspondent at the match, Jim Reynolds, described Narey's goal as "a wonderful right-foot shot which no goalkeeper in the world would have stopped." In 2018 the BBC named the goal as number 16 in their 50 Great World Cup moments. Narey made the last of his 35 appearances for Scotland in 1989.

After football
David Narey was one of the first inductees of the Dundee United Hall of Fame in January 2008. He was also inducted into the Scottish Football Hall of Fame in November 2010.

Career statistics

Club

International

Scores and results list Scotland's goal tally first.

Honours 
Dundee United
 Scottish Premier Division: 1982–83
 Scottish League Cup: 1979–80, 1980–81; runner-up: 1981–82, 1984–85
 Scottish Cup runner-up: 1980–81, 1984–85, 1986–87, 1987–88
 UEFA Cup runner-up: 1986–87

Raith Rovers
 Scottish League Cup: 1994–95
 Scottish First Division: 1994–95

See also
 List of footballers in Scotland by number of league appearances (500+)

References

Sources

External links
 
 

1956 births
Living people
Footballers from Dundee
Scottish Football League players
Scottish footballers
Scotland international footballers
Dundee United F.C. players
Raith Rovers F.C. players
Members of the Order of the British Empire
1982 FIFA World Cup players
1986 FIFA World Cup players
Scottish Football Hall of Fame inductees
Association football central defenders
Scottish Football League representative players
Scotland under-21 international footballers
Scotland under-23 international footballers